Dysgonia interpersa is a moth of the family Noctuidae first described by Achille Guenée in 1852. It is found in Indonesia.

References

Dysgonia